The 2010 Calder Cup playoffs of the American Hockey League began on April 14, 2010. The sixteen teams that qualified, eight from each conference, played best-of-seven series for division semifinals, finals and conference finals. The conference champions, Hershey Bears and Texas Stars, played a best-of-seven series for the Calder Cup that was won by the Hershey Bears in six games. This was the second consecutive Calder Cup for the Bears and their 11th overall.

Playoff seeds
After the 2009–10 AHL regular season, 16 teams qualified for the playoffs. The top eight teams from each conference qualified for the playoffs.

Eastern Conference

Atlantic Division
Worcester Sharks – 104 points
Portland Pirates – 101 points
Manchester Monarchs – 95 points
Lowell Devils – 88 points
Bridgeport Sound Tigers – 86 points

East Division
Hershey Bears – 123 points
Albany River Rats – 94 points
Wilkes-Barre/Scranton Penguins – 87 points

Western Conference

North Division
Hamilton Bulldogs – 115 points
Rochester Americans – 91 points
Abbotsford Heat – 90 points
Manitoba Moose – 87 points

West Division
Chicago Wolves – 105 points
Texas Stars – 99 points
Rockford IceHogs – 94 points
Milwaukee Admirals – 91 points

Bracket

In each round the team that earned more points during the regular season receives home ice advantage, meaning they receive the "extra" game on home-ice if the series reaches the maximum number of games. There is no set series format due to arena scheduling conflicts and travel considerations.

Playoff statistical leaders

Leading skaters 

These are the top ten skaters based on points. If there is a tie in points, goals take precedence over assists.

GP = Games played; G = Goals; A = Assists; Pts = Points; +/– = Plus-minus; PIM = Penalty minutes

Leading goaltenders 

This is a combined table of the top five goaltenders based on games played who have played at least 420 minutes. The table is initially sorted by goals against average, with the criterion for inclusion in bold.

GP = Games played; W = Wins; L = Losses; SA = Shots against; GA = Goals against; GAA = Goals against average; SV% = Save percentage; SO = Shutouts; TOI = Time on ice (in minutes)

Division Semifinals 
Note 1: All times are in Eastern Time (UTC-4).
Note 2: Game times in italics signify games to be played only if necessary.
Note 3: Home team is listed first.

Eastern Conference

East Division

(E1) Hershey Bears vs. (A5) Bridgeport Sound Tigers

(E2) Albany River Rats vs. (E3) Wilkes-Barre/Scranton Penguins

Atlantic Division

(A1) Worcester Sharks vs. (A4) Lowell Devils 

Due to scheduling issues Lowell hosted game 5.

(A2) Portland Pirates vs. (A3) Manchester Monarchs

Western Conference

North Division

(N1) Hamilton Bulldogs vs. (N4) Manitoba Moose

(N2) Rochester Americans vs. (N3) Abbotsford Heat

West Division

(W1) Chicago Wolves vs. (W4) Milwaukee Admirals

(W2) Texas Stars vs. (W3) Rockford IceHogs

Division Finals

Eastern Conference

East Division

(E1) Hershey Bears vs. (E2) Albany River Rats

Atlantic Division

(A1) Worcester Sharks vs. (A3) Manchester Monarchs

Western Conference

North Division

(N1) Hamilton Bulldogs vs. (N3) Abbotsford Heat

West Division

(W1) Chicago Wolves vs. (W2) Texas Stars

Conference Finals

Eastern Conference

Hershey Bears vs. Manchester Monarchs

Western Conference

Hamilton Bulldogs vs. Texas Stars

Calder Cup Finals

Hershey Bears vs. Texas Stars

The series began eight days after the conclusion of the Conference Finals, as the Giant Center hosted the Ringling Bros. and Barnum & Bailey Circus over the Memorial Day weekend.

See also
2009–10 AHL season
List of AHL seasons

References

Calder Cup playoffs
Calder Cup